Csány is a Hungarian-language surname, a variant of Csányi. Notable people with the surname include:

Elek Csány (1810–1847), Hungarian nobleman and jurist
László Csány (1790–1849), Hungarian politician

See also
 Csány

Hungarian-language surnames